Tangier Exportation Free Zone is a free economic zone located south of Tangier, Morocco. The zone has an area of 3.45 km². It is managed by Tangier Free Zone (TFZ).

References

External links
 TFZ official website
 Tangier the new Dubai - WebWire.com
 Tanger Free Zone (TFZ): La Future Vision Tanger Free Zone (TFZ): La Future Vision

Tangier
Business in Morocco
Special economic zones